Una rosa de Francia (also known as Virgin Rose) is a 2006 Spanish–Cuban romance and adventure film directed by Manuel Gutiérrez Aragón which stars Jorge Perugorría, Álex González, Broselianda Hernández and Ana de Armas.

Plot 
It is primarily set in 1950s Havana. Andrés is a young and idealistic man working for a boat skipper, Simón, involved in human trafficking. He becomes infatuated with Marie, one of the underage girls recruited by Simón who are educated in Madame's house for the purpose of marrying old and wealthy men.

Cast

Production 
A joint Spain–Cuba co-production, Una rosa de Francia was produced by Tornasol and the Instituto Cubano del Arte e Industria Cinematográficos (ICAIC). The film was shot in Cuba in 2005. It was written by Gutiérrez Aragón alongside Senel Paz. Gerardo Herrero and Javier López Blanco took over production duties. Alfredo Mayo took over cinematography duties.

Release 
Distributed by Alta Classics, the film was theatrically released in Spain on 3 February 2006.

See also 
 List of Spanish films of 2006

References 

Spanish adventure films
Cuban drama films
2000s Spanish-language films
2006 films
Films set in the 1950s
Films set in Havana
Films shot in Cuba
Films about prostitution
Tornasol Films films
2000s Spanish films